Záruby is the highest hill of the Little Carpathians. It is located at an altitude of 768 m, near the village of Smolenice.

Mountains of Slovakia
Mountains of the Western Carpathians